Łódź Hills Landscape Park (Park Krajobrazowy Wzniesień Łódzkich) is a protected area (Landscape Park) in central Poland, established in 1996, covering an area of .

The Park lies within Łódź Voivodeship: in Brzeziny County (Gmina Brzeziny, Gmina Dmosin), Łódź East County (Gmina Nowosolna) and Zgierz County (Gmina Stryków, Gmina Zgierz).

Within the Landscape Park are three nature reserves.

References 

Landscape parks in Poland
Parks in Łódź Voivodeship
Protected areas established in 1996
1996 establishments in Poland